This is a partial list of unnumbered minor planets for principal provisional designations assigned during 1–31 December 2003. , a total of 425 bodies remain unnumbered for this period. Objects for this year are listed on the following pages: A–E · F–G · H–L · M–R · Si · Sii · Siii · Siv · T · Ui · Uii · Uiii · Uiv · V · Wi · Wii and X–Y. Also see previous and next year.

X 

|- id="2003 XD" bgcolor=#fefefe
| 0 || 2003 XD || MBA-I || 17.46 || data-sort-value="0.96" | 960 m || multiple || 2003–2021 || 27 Mar 2021 || 116 || align=left | Disc.: LINEAR || 
|- id="2003 XH" bgcolor=#FA8072
| 0 || 2003 XH || MCA || 18.4 || 1.2 km || multiple || 2003–2018 || 11 Aug 2018 || 114 || align=left | Disc.: LINEAR || 
|- id="2003 XK" bgcolor=#FFC2E0
| 8 || 2003 XK || APO || 25.9 || data-sort-value="0.023" | 23 m || single || 3 days || 04 Dec 2003 || 16 || align=left | Disc.: LINEAR || 
|- id="2003 XM" bgcolor=#FFC2E0
| 0 || 2003 XM || AMO || 19.28 || data-sort-value="0.49" | 490 m || multiple || 2003–2021 || 09 Jan 2021 || 149 || align=left | Disc.: LINEAR || 
|- id="2003 XV" bgcolor=#FFC2E0
| 0 || 2003 XV || APO || 26.7 || data-sort-value="0.016" | 16 m || multiple || 2003–2011 || 06 Dec 2011 || 74 || align=left | Disc.: Spacewatch || 
|- id="2003 XW" bgcolor=#FA8072
| – || 2003 XW || MCA || 18.8 || data-sort-value="0.73" | 730 m || single || 29 days || 23 Dec 2003 || 32 || align=left | Disc.: LINEAR || 
|- id="2003 XK1" bgcolor=#d6d6d6
| 0 ||  || MBA-O || 16.75 || 2.5 km || multiple || 2003–2022 || 06 Jan 2022 || 163 || align=left | Disc.: SpacewatchAlt.: 2010 ER159, 2014 PH30, 2014 QK411 || 
|- id="2003 XN1" bgcolor=#d6d6d6
| 1 ||  || MBA-O || 17.4 || 1.8 km || multiple || 2003–2021 || 06 Jan 2021 || 80 || align=left | Disc.: SpacewatchAlt.: 2014 SQ247 || 
|- id="2003 XO1" bgcolor=#E9E9E9
| 0 ||  || MBA-M || 17.78 || 1.5 km || multiple || 2003–2021 || 08 Aug 2021 || 51 || align=left | Disc.: Spacewatch || 
|- id="2003 XQ1" bgcolor=#d6d6d6
| 0 ||  || MBA-O || 16.8 || 2.4 km || multiple || 2003–2021 || 16 Jan 2021 || 54 || align=left | Disc.: SpacewatchAdded on 17 January 2021 || 
|- id="2003 XG7" bgcolor=#FA8072
| 1 ||  || MCA || 17.4 || data-sort-value="0.98" | 980 m || multiple || 2003–2019 || 07 Jan 2019 || 145 || align=left | Disc.: LINEARAlt.: 2018 SH13 || 
|- id="2003 XJ7" bgcolor=#FFC2E0
| 6 ||  || APO || 26.4 || data-sort-value="0.019" | 19 m || single || 1 day || 06 Dec 2003 || 35 || align=left | Disc.: LINEAR || 
|- id="2003 XH10" bgcolor=#FFC2E0
| 6 ||  || APO || 25.5 || data-sort-value="0.028" | 28 m || single || 4 days || 08 Dec 2003 || 36 || align=left | Disc.: LINEAR || 
|- id="2003 XZ12" bgcolor=#FFC2E0
| 6 ||  || APO || 24.4 || data-sort-value="0.047" | 47 m || single || 10 days || 25 Dec 2003 || 30 || align=left | Disc.: LINEAR || 
|- id="2003 XB15" bgcolor=#fefefe
| 0 ||  || MBA-I || 17.35 || 1.0 km || multiple || 2003–2021 || 06 Dec 2021 || 203 || align=left | Disc.: LINEARAlt.: 2010 VB153, 2010 VE187 || 
|- id="2003 XG15" bgcolor=#FA8072
| 0 ||  || HUN || 18.33 || data-sort-value="0.64" | 640 m || multiple || 2003–2022 || 18 Jan 2022 || 100 || align=left | Disc.: LINEARAlt.: 2016 VV7 || 
|- id="2003 XT16" bgcolor=#E9E9E9
| 0 ||  || MBA-M || 17.2 || 1.5 km || multiple || 2003–2021 || 05 Jan 2021 || 65 || align=left | Disc.: SpacewatchAdded on 17 January 2021 || 
|- id="2003 XZ16" bgcolor=#E9E9E9
| 0 ||  || MBA-M || 17.3 || 1.5 km || multiple || 2003–2021 || 15 Jan 2021 || 154 || align=left | Disc.: NEATAlt.: 2016 XB19 || 
|- id="2003 XU17" bgcolor=#E9E9E9
| 0 ||  || MBA-M || 18.5 || data-sort-value="0.84" | 840 m || multiple || 2000–2021 || 17 Jan 2021 || 38 || align=left | Disc.: SpacewatchAlt.: 2020 XE14 || 
|- id="2003 XV18" bgcolor=#d6d6d6
| 2 ||  || MBA-O || 16.7 || 2.5 km || multiple || 2003–2019 || 19 Dec 2019 || 50 || align=left | Disc.: Spacewatch || 
|- id="2003 XK21" bgcolor=#FA8072
| 1 ||  || MCA || 16.4 || 3.4 km || multiple || 2003–2020 || 02 Feb 2020 || 155 || align=left | Disc.: SpacewatchAlt.: 2008 SS211 || 
|- id="2003 XC22" bgcolor=#FA8072
| 0 ||  || MCA || 17.0 || 1.7 km || multiple || 2003–2021 || 21 Jan 2021 || 125 || align=left | Disc.: LINEAR || 
|- id="2003 XF23" bgcolor=#d6d6d6
| 0 ||  || MBA-O || 16.50 || 2.8 km || multiple || 2003–2022 || 25 Jan 2022 || 124 || align=left | Disc.: Spacewatch || 
|- id="2003 XU24" bgcolor=#d6d6d6
| 0 ||  || MBA-O || 16.43 || 2.9 km || multiple || 2003–2021 || 13 Nov 2021 || 109 || align=left | Disc.: SpacewatchAdded on 17 January 2021Alt.: 2010 DZ89 || 
|- id="2003 XQ27" bgcolor=#d6d6d6
| 0 ||  || MBA-O || 16.1 || 3.4 km || multiple || 2002–2021 || 17 Jan 2021 || 221 || align=left | Disc.: LINEARAlt.: 2012 KJ38 || 
|- id="2003 XF28" bgcolor=#d6d6d6
| 0 ||  || MBA-O || 16.8 || 2.4 km || multiple || 2003–2021 || 12 Jan 2021 || 64 || align=left | Disc.: SpacewatchAlt.: 2016 CH245 || 
|- id="2003 XG28" bgcolor=#d6d6d6
| 0 ||  || MBA-O || 16.91 || 2.3 km || multiple || 2003–2021 || 01 May 2021 || 92 || align=left | Disc.: Spacewatch || 
|- id="2003 XP28" bgcolor=#d6d6d6
| 0 ||  || MBA-O || 16.62 || 2.6 km || multiple || 2003–2021 || 13 Apr 2021 || 66 || align=left | Disc.: Spacewatch || 
|- id="2003 XQ28" bgcolor=#d6d6d6
| 2 ||  || MBA-O || 17.1 || 2.1 km || multiple || 2003–2020 || 23 Nov 2020 || 44 || align=left | Disc.: SpacewatchAdded on 17 January 2021 || 
|- id="2003 XW28" bgcolor=#d6d6d6
| 0 ||  || MBA-O || 16.9 || 2.3 km || multiple || 2002–2021 || 04 Jan 2021 || 104 || align=left | Disc.: SpacewatchAlt.: 2013 TK148, 2014 WS131 || 
|- id="2003 XL29" bgcolor=#fefefe
| 0 ||  || MBA-I || 17.83 || data-sort-value="0.81" | 810 m || multiple || 2001–2021 || 08 May 2021 || 76 || align=left | Disc.: SpacewatchAlt.: 2014 OW8 || 
|- id="2003 XY29" bgcolor=#fefefe
| 0 ||  || MBA-I || 18.2 || data-sort-value="0.68" | 680 m || multiple || 2003–2021 || 16 Jan 2021 || 112 || align=left | Disc.: LPL/Spacewatch IIAlt.: 2008 AW21, 2015 DN36 || 
|- id="2003 XA30" bgcolor=#d6d6d6
| 0 ||  || MBA-O || 16.2 || 3.2 km || multiple || 2003–2021 || 14 Jan 2021 || 95 || align=left | Disc.: Spacewatch || 
|- id="2003 XC30" bgcolor=#d6d6d6
| 0 ||  || MBA-O || 17.19 || 2.0 km || multiple || 2003–2021 || 10 Apr 2021 || 78 || align=left | Disc.: SpacewatchAlt.: 2008 VP96, 2015 BK284 || 
|- id="2003 XD30" bgcolor=#E9E9E9
| 1 ||  || MBA-M || 18.34 || 1.2 km || multiple || 2003–2022 || 07 Jan 2022 || 73 || align=left | Disc.: SpacewatchAlt.: 2012 WY17 || 
|- id="2003 XK30" bgcolor=#fefefe
| 0 ||  || MBA-I || 18.0 || data-sort-value="0.75" | 750 m || multiple || 2003–2021 || 08 May 2021 || 42 || align=left | Disc.: SpacewatchAdded on 21 August 2021 || 
|- id="2003 XQ30" bgcolor=#d6d6d6
| 0 ||  || MBA-O || 17.1 || 2.1 km || multiple || 2003–2020 || 16 Dec 2020 || 63 || align=left | Disc.: Spacewatch || 
|- id="2003 XR30" bgcolor=#d6d6d6
| 0 ||  || MBA-O || 16.9 || 2.3 km || multiple || 2003–2021 || 09 Jan 2021 || 105 || align=left | Disc.: SpacewatchAlt.: 2008 RT45, 2008 RX93 || 
|- id="2003 XA31" bgcolor=#d6d6d6
| 0 ||  || MBA-O || 16.4 || 2.9 km || multiple || 2003–2021 || 06 Jan 2021 || 102 || align=left | Disc.: Spacewatch || 
|- id="2003 XD32" bgcolor=#fefefe
| 0 ||  || MBA-I || 18.57 || data-sort-value="0.57" | 570 m || multiple || 2003–2022 || 25 Jan 2022 || 116 || align=left | Disc.: SpacewatchAlt.: 2013 RM15 || 
|- id="2003 XL32" bgcolor=#fefefe
| 0 ||  || MBA-I || 18.75 || data-sort-value="0.53" | 530 m || multiple || 2003–2021 || 09 Nov 2021 || 70 || align=left | Disc.: LPL/Spacewatch IIAdded on 5 November 2021 || 
|- id="2003 XB34" bgcolor=#fefefe
| 0 ||  || MBA-I || 18.7 || data-sort-value="0.54" | 540 m || multiple || 2003–2021 || 15 Jan 2021 || 29 || align=left | Disc.: SpacewatchAdded on 21 August 2021 || 
|- id="2003 XM34" bgcolor=#fefefe
| 0 ||  || MBA-I || 18.8 || data-sort-value="0.52" | 520 m || multiple || 2003–2020 || 14 Nov 2020 || 57 || align=left | Disc.: LPL/Spacewatch II || 
|- id="2003 XX39" bgcolor=#d6d6d6
| 2 ||  || MBA-O || 17.7 || 1.6 km || multiple || 2003–2020 || 15 Oct 2020 || 61 || align=left | Disc.: LINEARAdded on 11 May 2021Alt.: 2020 OE10 || 
|- id="2003 XE40" bgcolor=#E9E9E9
| 0 ||  || MBA-M || 17.5 || 1.3 km || multiple || 2003–2021 || 04 Jan 2021 || 76 || align=left | Disc.: Spacewatch || 
|- id="2003 XP40" bgcolor=#E9E9E9
| 0 ||  || MBA-M || 17.2 || 1.5 km || multiple || 2001–2021 || 08 Jan 2021 || 118 || align=left | Disc.: SpacewatchAlt.: 2007 TF146, 2014 JH6 || 
|- id="2003 XY40" bgcolor=#d6d6d6
| 0 ||  || MBA-O || 17.35 || 1.9 km || multiple || 2003–2021 || 10 Apr 2021 || 61 || align=left | Disc.: Spacewatch || 
|- id="2003 XB41" bgcolor=#d6d6d6
| 0 ||  || MBA-O || 17.29 || 1.9 km || multiple || 2003–2021 || 17 Jun 2021 || 55 || align=left | Disc.: Spacewatch || 
|- id="2003 XN43" bgcolor=#d6d6d6
| 2 ||  || HIL || 15.6 || 4.2 km || multiple || 2003–2021 || 09 Apr 2021 || 37 || align=left | Disc.: LINEARAlt.: 2021 CW34 || 
|- id="2003 XR43" bgcolor=#d6d6d6
| 2 ||  || MBA-O || 17.2 || 2.0 km || multiple || 2003–2020 || 22 Jan 2020 || 47 || align=left | Disc.: Spacewatch || 
|- id="2003 XX43" bgcolor=#fefefe
| 0 ||  || MBA-I || 18.54 || data-sort-value="0.58" | 580 m || multiple || 2003–2021 || 30 Jun 2021 || 65 || align=left | Disc.: SpacewatchAlt.: 2008 HH63 || 
|- id="2003 XY43" bgcolor=#d6d6d6
| 0 ||  || MBA-O || 17.3 || 1.9 km || multiple || 2003–2019 || 03 Dec 2019 || 38 || align=left | Disc.: Spacewatch || 
|- id="2003 XE44" bgcolor=#d6d6d6
| 0 ||  || MBA-O || 15.8 || 3.9 km || multiple || 1992–2021 || 17 Jan 2021 || 141 || align=left | Disc.: Spacewatch || 
|- id="2003 XF44" bgcolor=#fefefe
| 0 ||  || MBA-I || 18.4 || data-sort-value="0.62" | 620 m || multiple || 2003–2021 || 08 Jan 2021 || 145 || align=left | Disc.: Spacewatch || 
|- id="2003 XG44" bgcolor=#fefefe
| 0 ||  || MBA-I || 18.4 || data-sort-value="0.62" | 620 m || multiple || 2003–2019 || 23 Sep 2019 || 163 || align=left | Disc.: Spacewatch || 
|- id="2003 XH44" bgcolor=#E9E9E9
| 0 ||  || MBA-M || 17.6 || data-sort-value="0.90" | 900 m || multiple || 2003–2021 || 12 Jan 2021 || 83 || align=left | Disc.: Spacewatch || 
|- id="2003 XK44" bgcolor=#fefefe
| 0 ||  || MBA-I || 18.74 || data-sort-value="0.53" | 530 m || multiple || 2003–2021 || 09 Aug 2021 || 88 || align=left | Disc.: Spacewatch || 
|- id="2003 XL44" bgcolor=#fefefe
| 0 ||  || MBA-I || 18.29 || data-sort-value="0.65" | 650 m || multiple || 2003–2021 || 09 May 2021 || 114 || align=left | Disc.: Spacewatch || 
|- id="2003 XM44" bgcolor=#d6d6d6
| 0 ||  || MBA-O || 17.28 || 1.9 km || multiple || 2003–2021 || 31 Aug 2021 || 66 || align=left | Disc.: Spacewatch || 
|- id="2003 XO44" bgcolor=#fefefe
| 0 ||  || MBA-I || 18.4 || data-sort-value="0.62" | 620 m || multiple || 2003–2020 || 15 Sep 2020 || 89 || align=left | Disc.: Spacewatch || 
|- id="2003 XP44" bgcolor=#d6d6d6
| 0 ||  || MBA-O || 16.73 || 2.5 km || multiple || 2003–2022 || 27 Jan 2022 || 72 || align=left | Disc.: Spacewatch || 
|- id="2003 XQ44" bgcolor=#fefefe
| 0 ||  || MBA-I || 18.30 || data-sort-value="0.65" | 650 m || multiple || 2003–2021 || 07 Dec 2021 || 60 || align=left | Disc.: Spacewatch || 
|- id="2003 XR44" bgcolor=#E9E9E9
| 0 ||  || MBA-M || 17.3 || 1.5 km || multiple || 2003–2021 || 07 Jan 2021 || 92 || align=left | Disc.: LPL/Spacewatch II || 
|- id="2003 XS44" bgcolor=#d6d6d6
| 0 ||  || MBA-O || 16.17 || 3.2 km || multiple || 2003–2022 || 27 Jan 2022 || 173 || align=left | Disc.: Spacewatch || 
|- id="2003 XT44" bgcolor=#d6d6d6
| 0 ||  || MBA-O || 16.7 || 2.5 km || multiple || 2003–2021 || 18 Jan 2021 || 54 || align=left | Disc.: SpacewatchAlt.: 2016 AV177 || 
|- id="2003 XV44" bgcolor=#E9E9E9
| 0 ||  || MBA-M || 17.0 || 2.2 km || multiple || 2003–2021 || 11 Jun 2021 || 75 || align=left | Disc.: LPL/Spacewatch II || 
|- id="2003 XW44" bgcolor=#E9E9E9
| 0 ||  || MBA-M || 18.1 || data-sort-value="0.71" | 710 m || multiple || 2003–2019 || 30 Nov 2019 || 97 || align=left | Disc.: Spacewatch || 
|- id="2003 XA45" bgcolor=#fefefe
| 0 ||  || MBA-I || 18.7 || data-sort-value="0.54" | 540 m || multiple || 2003–2021 || 04 Jan 2021 || 60 || align=left | Disc.: Spacewatch || 
|- id="2003 XB45" bgcolor=#fefefe
| 0 ||  || MBA-I || 18.0 || data-sort-value="0.75" | 750 m || multiple || 2003–2020 || 22 Dec 2020 || 86 || align=left | Disc.: LPL/Spacewatch II || 
|- id="2003 XD45" bgcolor=#E9E9E9
| 0 ||  || MBA-M || 17.57 || 1.7 km || multiple || 2003–2021 || 28 Dec 2021 || 49 || align=left | Disc.: Spacewatch || 
|- id="2003 XE45" bgcolor=#E9E9E9
| 0 ||  || MBA-M || 17.99 || 1.4 km || multiple || 2003–2021 || 30 Nov 2021 || 67 || align=left | Disc.: Spacewatch || 
|- id="2003 XF45" bgcolor=#E9E9E9
| 0 ||  || MBA-M || 17.3 || 1.5 km || multiple || 2003–2021 || 02 Jan 2021 || 125 || align=left | Disc.: Spacewatch || 
|- id="2003 XG45" bgcolor=#d6d6d6
| 0 ||  || MBA-O || 17.42 || 1.8 km || multiple || 2003–2021 || 22 Mar 2021 || 47 || align=left | Disc.: Spacewatch || 
|- id="2003 XK45" bgcolor=#d6d6d6
| 0 ||  || MBA-O || 16.6 || 2.7 km || multiple || 2003–2021 || 16 Jan 2021 || 66 || align=left | Disc.: Spacewatch || 
|- id="2003 XL45" bgcolor=#fefefe
| 0 ||  || MBA-I || 17.99 || data-sort-value="0.75" | 750 m || multiple || 2003–2021 || 06 Dec 2021 || 29 || align=left | Disc.: Spacewatch || 
|- id="2003 XM45" bgcolor=#E9E9E9
| 2 ||  || MBA-M || 19.1 || data-sort-value="0.64" | 640 m || multiple || 2003–2020 || 12 Sep 2020 || 21 || align=left | Disc.: Spacewatch || 
|- id="2003 XO45" bgcolor=#d6d6d6
| 0 ||  || MBA-O || 16.8 || 2.4 km || multiple || 2003–2019 || 19 Oct 2019 || 66 || align=left | Disc.: LPL/Spacewatch II || 
|- id="2003 XP45" bgcolor=#fefefe
| 0 ||  || MBA-I || 18.5 || data-sort-value="0.59" | 590 m || multiple || 2003–2019 || 01 Nov 2019 || 72 || align=left | Disc.: LPL/Spacewatch II || 
|- id="2003 XQ45" bgcolor=#d6d6d6
| 0 ||  || MBA-O || 16.9 || 2.3 km || multiple || 2003–2020 || 16 Nov 2020 || 71 || align=left | Disc.: LPL/Spacewatch II || 
|- id="2003 XR45" bgcolor=#fefefe
| 0 ||  || MBA-I || 18.58 || data-sort-value="0.57" | 570 m || multiple || 2003–2021 || 17 Jun 2021 || 60 || align=left | Disc.: Spacewatch || 
|- id="2003 XS45" bgcolor=#d6d6d6
| 0 ||  || MBA-O || 16.5 || 2.8 km || multiple || 2003–2021 || 21 Jan 2021 || 87 || align=left | Disc.: Spacewatch || 
|- id="2003 XT45" bgcolor=#fefefe
| 0 ||  || MBA-I || 18.22 || data-sort-value="0.67" | 670 m || multiple || 2003–2018 || 29 Sep 2018 || 62 || align=left | Disc.: Spacewatch || 
|- id="2003 XU45" bgcolor=#d6d6d6
| 0 ||  || MBA-O || 16.94 || 2.3 km || multiple || 1992–2021 || 17 Apr 2021 || 101 || align=left | Disc.: Spacewatch || 
|- id="2003 XW45" bgcolor=#d6d6d6
| 0 ||  || MBA-O || 17.19 || 2.0 km || multiple || 2003–2021 || 08 Apr 2021 || 99 || align=left | Disc.: Spacewatch || 
|- id="2003 XX45" bgcolor=#d6d6d6
| 0 ||  || MBA-O || 16.9 || 2.3 km || multiple || 2003–2021 || 17 Jan 2021 || 49 || align=left | Disc.: LPL/Spacewatch II || 
|- id="2003 XY45" bgcolor=#fefefe
| 1 ||  || MBA-I || 19.1 || data-sort-value="0.45" | 450 m || multiple || 2003–2020 || 20 Oct 2020 || 50 || align=left | Disc.: Spacewatch || 
|- id="2003 XA46" bgcolor=#E9E9E9
| 0 ||  || MBA-M || 17.84 || 1.5 km || multiple || 2003–2021 || 11 Sep 2021 || 57 || align=left | Disc.: LPL/Spacewatch II || 
|- id="2003 XB46" bgcolor=#d6d6d6
| 0 ||  || MBA-O || 16.9 || 2.3 km || multiple || 2003–2020 || 22 Jan 2020 || 63 || align=left | Disc.: Spacewatch || 
|- id="2003 XC46" bgcolor=#d6d6d6
| 0 ||  || MBA-O || 17.52 || 1.7 km || multiple || 1992–2021 || 06 Apr 2021 || 61 || align=left | Disc.: Spacewatch || 
|- id="2003 XE46" bgcolor=#d6d6d6
| 0 ||  || MBA-O || 16.85 || 2.4 km || multiple || 2003–2021 || 09 May 2021 || 51 || align=left | Disc.: Spacewatch || 
|- id="2003 XF46" bgcolor=#E9E9E9
| 0 ||  || MBA-M || 17.9 || 1.1 km || multiple || 2003–2020 || 17 Dec 2020 || 61 || align=left | Disc.: Spacewatch || 
|- id="2003 XH46" bgcolor=#d6d6d6
| 0 ||  || MBA-O || 17.06 || 2.2 km || multiple || 2003–2021 || 14 Apr 2021 || 90 || align=left | Disc.: SpacewatchAlt.: 2010 HH129 || 
|- id="2003 XJ46" bgcolor=#d6d6d6
| 0 ||  || MBA-O || 17.02 || 2.2 km || multiple || 2003–2021 || 14 Apr 2021 || 77 || align=left | Disc.: Spacewatch || 
|- id="2003 XK46" bgcolor=#E9E9E9
| 0 ||  || MBA-M || 17.62 || 1.7 km || multiple || 2003–2021 || 04 Oct 2021 || 57 || align=left | Disc.: Spacewatch || 
|- id="2003 XL46" bgcolor=#d6d6d6
| 0 ||  || MBA-O || 17.0 || 2.2 km || multiple || 2003–2021 || 12 Jan 2021 || 38 || align=left | Disc.: Spacewatch || 
|- id="2003 XM46" bgcolor=#d6d6d6
| 0 ||  || MBA-O || 17.84 || 1.5 km || multiple || 2003–2021 || 15 Apr 2021 || 53 || align=left | Disc.: LPL/Spacewatch IIAlt.: 2010 CE167 || 
|- id="2003 XN46" bgcolor=#d6d6d6
| 0 ||  || MBA-O || 17.2 || 2.0 km || multiple || 2003–2019 || 29 Sep 2019 || 25 || align=left | Disc.: Spacewatch || 
|- id="2003 XO46" bgcolor=#E9E9E9
| 0 ||  || MBA-M || 17.97 || 1.1 km || multiple || 1998–2022 || 27 Jan 2022 || 43 || align=left | Disc.: SpacewatchAdded on 17 January 2021 || 
|- id="2003 XP46" bgcolor=#fefefe
| 3 ||  || MBA-I || 18.9 || data-sort-value="0.49" | 490 m || multiple || 2003–2020 || 08 Dec 2020 || 53 || align=left | Disc.: SpacewatchAdded on 17 January 2021 || 
|- id="2003 XQ46" bgcolor=#E9E9E9
| 0 ||  || MBA-M || 18.32 || 1.2 km || multiple || 1998–2021 || 07 Sep 2021 || 34 || align=left | Disc.: SpacewatchAdded on 17 June 2021 || 
|- id="2003 XS46" bgcolor=#FA8072
| 1 ||  || HUN || 18.7 || data-sort-value="0.54" | 540 m || multiple || 2003–2020 || 31 Jan 2020 || 37 || align=left | Disc.: SpacewatchAdded on 21 August 2021 || 
|- id="2003 XV46" bgcolor=#fefefe
| 0 ||  || MBA-I || 19.07 || data-sort-value="0.46" | 460 m || multiple || 2003–2021 || 09 Dec 2021 || 46 || align=left | Disc.: SpacewatchAdded on 24 December 2021 || 
|}
back to top

Y 

|- id="2003 YJ" bgcolor=#FFC2E0
| 0 || 2003 YJ || ATE || 20.34 || data-sort-value="0.30" | 300 m || multiple || 2003–2021 || 09 Nov 2021 || 221 || align=left | — || 
|- id="2003 YM" bgcolor=#FA8072
| 0 || 2003 YM || MCA || 16.7 || 1.9 km || multiple || 2000–2021 || 14 Jan 2021 || 85 || align=left | — || 
|- id="2003 YM1" bgcolor=#FFC2E0
| 0 ||  || AMO || 18.00 || data-sort-value="0.89" | 890 m || multiple || 2003–2021 || 17 May 2021 || 651 || align=left | NEO larger than 1 kilometer || 
|- id="2003 YN1" bgcolor=#FFC2E0
| 7 ||  || APO || 24.9 || data-sort-value="0.037" | 37 m || single || 12 days || 27 Dec 2003 || 23 || align=left | AMO at MPC || 
|- id="2003 YP1" bgcolor=#FFC2E0
| 5 ||  || APO || 21.8 || data-sort-value="0.16" | 160 m || single || 56 days || 30 Jan 2004 || 69 || align=left | Potentially hazardous object || 
|- id="2003 YQ1" bgcolor=#FFC2E0
| 6 ||  || AMO || 22.0 || data-sort-value="0.14" | 140 m || single || 23 days || 10 Jan 2004 || 54 || align=left | — || 
|- id="2003 YR1" bgcolor=#FFC2E0
| 3 ||  || ATE || 22.2 || data-sort-value="0.13" | 130 m || multiple || 2003–2020 || 21 Dec 2020 || 58 || align=left | — || 
|- id="2003 YS1" bgcolor=#FFC2E0
| 6 ||  || APO || 19.6 || data-sort-value="0.43" | 430 m || single || 27 days || 13 Jan 2004 || 47 || align=left | — || 
|- id="2003 YV1" bgcolor=#FA8072
| 2 ||  || MCA || 16.9 || 1.2 km || multiple || 2003–2015 || 15 Aug 2015 || 109 || align=left | — || 
|- id="2003 YW1" bgcolor=#FFC2E0
| 2 ||  || AMO || 22.2 || data-sort-value="0.13" | 130 m || multiple || 2003–2019 || 07 Jan 2019 || 46 || align=left | — || 
|- id="2003 YZ1" bgcolor=#FA8072
| 0 ||  || MCA || 18.94 || data-sort-value="0.48" | 480 m || multiple || 2003–2021 || 17 Apr 2021 || 132 || align=left | — || 
|- id="2003 YL2" bgcolor=#FA8072
| 0 ||  || MCA || 18.05 || 1.4 km || multiple || 2003–2021 || 03 Dec 2021 || 122 || align=left | — || 
|- id="2003 YQ2" bgcolor=#E9E9E9
| – ||  || MBA-M || 18.1 || data-sort-value="0.71" | 710 m || single || 3 days || 21 Dec 2003 || 17 || align=left | — || 
|- id="2003 YP3" bgcolor=#FFC2E0
| 0 ||  || APO || 20.22 || data-sort-value="0.32" | 320 m || multiple || 2003–2021 || 10 Jul 2021 || 169 || align=left | — || 
|- id="2003 YT3" bgcolor=#E9E9E9
| 0 ||  || MBA-M || 17.1 || 1.1 km || multiple || 2003–2021 || 15 Jan 2021 || 86 || align=left | — || 
|- id="2003 YR4" bgcolor=#FA8072
| 4 ||  || MCA || 17.9 || data-sort-value="0.78" | 780 m || multiple || 2003–2021 || 14 Jan 2021 || 41 || align=left | — || 
|- id="2003 YJ6" bgcolor=#E9E9E9
| 0 ||  || MBA-M || 16.8 || 1.3 km || multiple || 2003–2021 || 17 Jan 2021 || 100 || align=left | — || 
|- id="2003 YE7" bgcolor=#fefefe
| 0 ||  || MBA-I || 18.20 || data-sort-value="0.68" | 680 m || multiple || 2003–2021 || 15 Apr 2021 || 112 || align=left | — || 
|- id="2003 YM7" bgcolor=#FA8072
| 1 ||  || MCA || 19.2 || data-sort-value="0.43" | 430 m || multiple || 2003–2020 || 22 Mar 2020 || 97 || align=left | — || 
|- id="2003 YN7" bgcolor=#FFC2E0
| 6 ||  || APO || 20.6 || data-sort-value="0.27" | 270 m || single || 25 days || 13 Jan 2004 || 74 || align=left | — || 
|- id="2003 YP7" bgcolor=#E9E9E9
| 0 ||  || MBA-M || 17.5 || data-sort-value="0.94" | 940 m || multiple || 2003–2021 || 15 May 2021 || 134 || align=left | Alt.: 2013 JL79 || 
|- id="2003 YG8" bgcolor=#fefefe
| 2 ||  || HUN || 18.8 || data-sort-value="0.52" | 520 m || multiple || 2003–2021 || 04 Dec 2021 || 39 || align=left | Disc.: LINEARAdded on 24 December 2021 || 
|- id="2003 YX8" bgcolor=#fefefe
| 0 ||  || MBA-I || 18.42 || data-sort-value="0.62" | 620 m || multiple || 2003–2021 || 05 Jan 2021 || 51 || align=left | — || 
|- id="2003 YY8" bgcolor=#fefefe
| 0 ||  || HUN || 18.25 || data-sort-value="0.67" | 670 m || multiple || 2003–2021 || 18 May 2021 || 108 || align=left | — || 
|- id="2003 YQ9" bgcolor=#fefefe
| 0 ||  || MBA-I || 16.9 || 1.2 km || multiple || 2003–2020 || 24 Dec 2020 || 184 || align=left | Alt.: 2007 TE385, 2018 CM12 || 
|- id="2003 YE13" bgcolor=#FA8072
| 1 ||  || MCA || 17.5 || 1.8 km || multiple || 2003–2021 || 11 Jun 2021 || 69 || align=left | Alt.: 2014 WW365 || 
|- id="2003 YC14" bgcolor=#E9E9E9
| 0 ||  || MBA-M || 16.17 || 1.7 km || multiple || 2003–2021 || 18 Apr 2021 || 304 || align=left | Alt.: 2017 DM58 || 
|- id="2003 YP17" bgcolor=#FFC2E0
| 0 ||  || AMO || 19.10 || data-sort-value="0.54" | 540 m || multiple || 2003–2021 || 11 Jul 2021 || 855 || align=left | — || 
|- id="2003 YR17" bgcolor=#FA8072
| 1 ||  || MCA || 17.7 || 1.2 km || multiple || 2003–2020 || 23 Oct 2020 || 102 || align=left | — || 
|- id="2003 YS17" bgcolor=#FFC2E0
| 2 ||  || ATE || 21.6 || data-sort-value="0.17" | 170 m || multiple || 2003–2021 || 08 Jan 2021 || 201 || align=left | Potentially hazardous object || 
|- id="2003 YG19" bgcolor=#d6d6d6
| 1 ||  || MBA-O || 16.4 || 2.9 km || multiple || 2003–2021 || 16 Jan 2021 || 67 || align=left | Alt.: 2015 BT78 || 
|- id="2003 YH19" bgcolor=#d6d6d6
| 0 ||  || MBA-O || 16.0 || 3.5 km || multiple || 2001–2020 || 25 Nov 2020 || 118 || align=left | Alt.: 2011 FU86 || 
|- id="2003 YR20" bgcolor=#E9E9E9
| 0 ||  || MBA-M || 17.2 || 1.5 km || multiple || 2003–2021 || 17 Jan 2021 || 107 || align=left | — || 
|- id="2003 YH22" bgcolor=#fefefe
| 3 ||  || HUN || 18.4 || data-sort-value="0.62" | 620 m || multiple || 2003–2020 || 15 Feb 2020 || 38 || align=left | — || 
|- id="2003 YT28" bgcolor=#d6d6d6
| 0 ||  || MBA-O || 16.5 || 2.8 km || multiple || 2003–2020 || 28 Jan 2020 || 130 || align=left | — || 
|- id="2003 YD30" bgcolor=#fefefe
| 0 ||  || HUN || 18.09 || data-sort-value="0.72" | 720 m || multiple || 2003–2021 || 28 Oct 2021 || 118 || align=left | — || 
|- id="2003 YH30" bgcolor=#E9E9E9
| 0 ||  || MBA-M || 17.68 || 1.2 km || multiple || 2003–2021 || 12 Jan 2021 || 125 || align=left | Alt.: 2003 YS178 || 
|- id="2003 YL30" bgcolor=#d6d6d6
| 0 ||  || MBA-O || 17.01 || 2.2 km || multiple || 2001–2021 || 11 Apr 2021 || 160 || align=left | — || 
|- id="2003 YY36" bgcolor=#E9E9E9
| 0 ||  || MBA-M || 18.1 || 1.0 km || multiple || 2003–2021 || 17 Jan 2021 || 47 || align=left | Alt.: 2017 DL13 || 
|- id="2003 YC37" bgcolor=#E9E9E9
| 0 ||  || MBA-M || 17.3 || 1.0 km || multiple || 2003–2021 || 16 Jan 2021 || 112 || align=left | Disc.: SpacewatchAdded on 17 January 2021Alt.: 2017 GX10 || 
|- id="2003 YB38" bgcolor=#d6d6d6
| 0 ||  || MBA-O || 16.59 || 2.7 km || multiple || 2003–2021 || 09 Apr 2021 || 75 || align=left | Alt.: 2015 BU53 || 
|- id="2003 YG38" bgcolor=#E9E9E9
| 0 ||  || MBA-M || 17.5 || 1.3 km || multiple || 2003–2021 || 12 Jan 2021 || 96 || align=left | Alt.: 2017 BP104 || 
|- id="2003 YO41" bgcolor=#fefefe
| 2 ||  || MBA-I || 18.1 || data-sort-value="0.71" | 710 m || multiple || 2003–2020 || 10 Nov 2020 || 87 || align=left | — || 
|- id="2003 YN42" bgcolor=#E9E9E9
| 0 ||  || MBA-M || 17.60 || 1.3 km || multiple || 2003–2022 || 27 Jan 2022 || 111 || align=left | — || 
|- id="2003 YS42" bgcolor=#fefefe
| 0 ||  || MBA-I || 18.0 || data-sort-value="0.75" | 750 m || multiple || 2003–2021 || 18 Jan 2021 || 87 || align=left | Alt.: 2011 BX56, 2013 YT148 || 
|- id="2003 YL44" bgcolor=#E9E9E9
| 0 ||  || MBA-M || 16.9 || 1.2 km || multiple || 2003–2021 || 15 Jan 2021 || 63 || align=left | — || 
|- id="2003 YD45" bgcolor=#FFC2E0
| 6 ||  || APO || 21.0 || data-sort-value="0.22" | 220 m || single || 30 days || 19 Jan 2004 || 56 || align=left | Potentially hazardous object || 
|- id="2003 YB46" bgcolor=#fefefe
| 1 ||  || MBA-I || 17.3 || 1.0 km || multiple || 2003–2020 || 27 Feb 2020 || 87 || align=left | — || 
|- id="2003 YS46" bgcolor=#d6d6d6
| 0 ||  || MBA-O || 16.12 || 3.3 km || multiple || 2001–2022 || 09 Jan 2022 || 107 || align=left | — || 
|- id="2003 YL49" bgcolor=#E9E9E9
| 0 ||  || MBA-M || 17.53 || 1.7 km || multiple || 2003–2022 || 05 Jan 2022 || 68 || align=left | — || 
|- id="2003 YY49" bgcolor=#FA8072
| 1 ||  || MCA || 18.48 || data-sort-value="0.60" | 600 m || multiple || 2003–2021 || 27 Nov 2021 || 141 || align=left | Alt.: 2021 OJ10 || 
|- id="2003 YD53" bgcolor=#E9E9E9
| 0 ||  || MBA-M || 16.6 || 2.7 km || multiple || 2003–2020 || 11 May 2020 || 80 || align=left | — || 
|- id="2003 YF67" bgcolor=#E9E9E9
| 0 ||  || MBA-M || 17.99 || 1.4 km || multiple || 2003–2021 || 08 Nov 2021 || 84 || align=left | — || 
|- id="2003 YH67" bgcolor=#d6d6d6
| 0 ||  || MBA-O || 16.63 || 2.6 km || multiple || 2003–2021 || 12 May 2021 || 95 || align=left | — || 
|- id="2003 YK67" bgcolor=#d6d6d6
| 0 ||  || MBA-O || 16.2 || 3.2 km || multiple || 2003–2021 || 14 Jan 2021 || 105 || align=left | Alt.: 2010 FB39 || 
|- id="2003 YM67" bgcolor=#E9E9E9
| 2 ||  || MBA-M || 18.2 || data-sort-value="0.68" | 680 m || multiple || 2003–2020 || 24 Dec 2020 || 20 || align=left | Disc.: SpacewatchAdded on 17 January 2021 || 
|- id="2003 YT67" bgcolor=#fefefe
| 0 ||  || MBA-I || 18.7 || data-sort-value="0.54" | 540 m || multiple || 2003–2020 || 15 Oct 2020 || 40 || align=left | Disc.: SpacewatchAdded on 17 January 2021 || 
|- id="2003 YV67" bgcolor=#d6d6d6
| 0 ||  || MBA-O || 16.9 || 2.3 km || multiple || 2003–2021 || 18 Jan 2021 || 83 || align=left | — || 
|- id="2003 YW67" bgcolor=#E9E9E9
| 2 ||  || MBA-M || 19.1 || data-sort-value="0.64" | 640 m || multiple || 2003–2020 || 07 Dec 2020 || 41 || align=left | — || 
|- id="2003 YX67" bgcolor=#fefefe
| 1 ||  || MBA-I || 18.7 || data-sort-value="0.54" | 540 m || multiple || 2003–2021 || 18 Jan 2021 || 61 || align=left | — || 
|- id="2003 YC68" bgcolor=#E9E9E9
| 0 ||  || MBA-M || 17.80 || 1.5 km || multiple || 2003–2021 || 07 Nov 2021 || 68 || align=left | — || 
|- id="2003 YW68" bgcolor=#E9E9E9
| 0 ||  || MBA-M || 17.49 || data-sort-value="0.94" | 940 m || multiple || 2003–2021 || 06 Apr 2021 || 94 || align=left | — || 
|- id="2003 YQ70" bgcolor=#FA8072
| – ||  || MCA || 19.2 || data-sort-value="0.43" | 430 m || single || 8 days || 30 Dec 2003 || 28 || align=left | — || 
|- id="2003 YS70" bgcolor=#FFC2E0
| 5 ||  || APO || 29.1 || data-sort-value="0.0054" | 5 m || single || 5 days || 27 Dec 2003 || 70 || align=left | — || 
|- id="2003 YT70" bgcolor=#FFC2E0
| 7 ||  || AMO || 25.8 || data-sort-value="0.025" | 25 m || single || 22 days || 13 Jan 2004 || 24 || align=left | — || 
|- id="2003 YS73" bgcolor=#d6d6d6
| 0 ||  || MBA-O || 16.5 || 2.8 km || multiple || 2003–2020 || 25 Dec 2020 || 188 || align=left | Alt.: 2010 HS9 || 
|- id="2003 YA74" bgcolor=#d6d6d6
| 2 ||  || MBA-O || 17.2 || 2.0 km || multiple || 2003–2018 || 13 Dec 2018 || 26 || align=left | — || 
|- id="2003 YO74" bgcolor=#E9E9E9
| 0 ||  || MBA-M || 16.8 || 1.3 km || multiple || 2003–2021 || 04 Jan 2021 || 87 || align=left | — || 
|- id="2003 YO80" bgcolor=#d6d6d6
| 1 ||  || MBA-O || 16.6 || 3.5 km || multiple || 2003–2021 || 10 Apr 2021 || 98 || align=left | Alt.: 2010 CL195 || 
|- id="2003 YE86" bgcolor=#d6d6d6
| 0 ||  || MBA-O || 16.14 || 3.3 km || multiple || 2003–2021 || 01 Apr 2021 || 145 || align=left | Alt.: 2010 HT14, 2015 AE1 || 
|- id="2003 YA92" bgcolor=#d6d6d6
| 0 ||  || MBA-O || 14.64 || 6.6 km || multiple || 2002–2022 || 13 Jan 2022 || 375 || align=left | Alt.: 2006 FO52, 2008 WS141, 2010 EW54, 2013 LT6 || 
|- id="2003 YX92" bgcolor=#E9E9E9
| 0 ||  || MBA-M || 16.9 || 1.8 km || multiple || 2003–2021 || 13 Jan 2021 || 109 || align=left | Alt.: 2006 SY421 || 
|- id="2003 YN93" bgcolor=#E9E9E9
| 0 ||  || MBA-M || 17.72 || 1.6 km || multiple || 2003–2022 || 08 Jan 2022 || 32 || align=left | — || 
|- id="2003 YP94" bgcolor=#FFC2E0
| 7 ||  || APO || 23.8 || data-sort-value="0.062" | 62 m || single || 11 days || 02 Jan 2004 || 38 || align=left | AMO at MPC || 
|- id="2003 YV97" bgcolor=#E9E9E9
| 1 ||  || MBA-M || 17.2 || 1.5 km || multiple || 2003–2021 || 10 Jan 2021 || 309 || align=left | Alt.: 2007 RY198 || 
|- id="2003 YL106" bgcolor=#E9E9E9
| 0 ||  || MBA-M || 17.16 || 2.1 km || multiple || 2003–2022 || 06 Jan 2022 || 149 || align=left | Alt.: 2014 HB160 || 
|- id="2003 YH107" bgcolor=#E9E9E9
| 0 ||  || MBA-M || 17.1 || 1.6 km || multiple || 2003–2021 || 12 Jan 2021 || 128 || align=left | Alt.: 2016 XS19 || 
|- id="2003 YN107" bgcolor=#FFC2E0
| 2 ||  || ATE || 26.5 || data-sort-value="0.018" | 18 m || multiple || 2003–2005 || 31 Mar 2005 || 45 || align=left | — || 
|- id="2003 YC108" bgcolor=#E9E9E9
| 0 ||  || MBA-M || 16.5 || 1.5 km || multiple || 2000–2021 || 12 Jun 2021 || 120 || align=left | — || 
|- id="2003 YE108" bgcolor=#fefefe
| 0 ||  || MBA-I || 18.07 || data-sort-value="0.72" | 720 m || multiple || 2003–2021 || 02 Dec 2021 || 94 || align=left | Disc.: LINEARAdded on 5 November 2021 || 
|- id="2003 YM109" bgcolor=#E9E9E9
| 0 ||  || MBA-M || 17.02 || 1.2 km || multiple || 2000–2021 || 18 May 2021 || 186 || align=left | Alt.: 2005 JX59, 2016 AC189 || 
|- id="2003 YS110" bgcolor=#fefefe
| 0 ||  || HUN || 17.8 || data-sort-value="0.82" | 820 m || multiple || 2003–2020 || 24 Jan 2020 || 142 || align=left | Alt.: 2012 BP35, 2014 WA495, 2016 TO10 || 
|- id="2003 YT110" bgcolor=#d6d6d6
| 1 ||  || MBA-O || 18.2 || 1.3 km || multiple || 1997–2020 || 17 Dec 2020 || 97 || align=left | — || 
|- id="2003 YU110" bgcolor=#E9E9E9
| 0 ||  || MBA-M || 17.2 || 1.1 km || multiple || 1998–2020 || 23 Oct 2020 || 101 || align=left | Disc.: Piszkéstető Stn.Added on 13 September 2020Alt.: 2015 VZ31 || 
|- id="2003 YV110" bgcolor=#E9E9E9
| 1 ||  || MBA-M || 17.5 || data-sort-value="0.94" | 940 m || multiple || 2002–2019 || 05 Nov 2019 || 91 || align=left | — || 
|- id="2003 YH111" bgcolor=#FFC2E0
| 6 ||  || APO || 24.5 || data-sort-value="0.045" | 45 m || single || 2 days || 29 Dec 2003 || 115 || align=left | — || 
|- id="2003 YJ112" bgcolor=#d6d6d6
| 0 ||  || MBA-O || 15.85 || 3.8 km || multiple || 2003–2021 || 08 Apr 2021 || 82 || align=left | Alt.: 2010 KQ65 || 
|- id="2003 YC115" bgcolor=#d6d6d6
| 0 ||  || MBA-O || 17.09 || 2.1 km || multiple || 2003–2021 || 06 Apr 2021 || 64 || align=left | Alt.: 2014 YO7 || 
|- id="2003 YG115" bgcolor=#E9E9E9
| 0 ||  || MBA-M || 17.22 || 1.1 km || multiple || 2003–2021 || 13 May 2021 || 63 || align=left | Alt.: 2017 HK33 || 
|- id="2003 YA116" bgcolor=#d6d6d6
| 0 ||  || MBA-O || 15.93 || 3.6 km || multiple || 2003–2021 || 17 May 2021 || 204 || align=left | — || 
|- id="2003 YJ117" bgcolor=#FA8072
| – ||  || MCA || 18.2 || data-sort-value="0.68" | 680 m || single || 38 days || 24 Jan 2004 || 24 || align=left | — || 
|- id="2003 YR117" bgcolor=#FFC2E0
| 7 ||  || APO || 22.9 || data-sort-value="0.093" | 93 m || single || 15 days || 12 Jan 2004 || 45 || align=left | — || 
|- id="2003 YE118" bgcolor=#fefefe
| 0 ||  || MBA-I || 18.10 || data-sort-value="0.71" | 710 m || multiple || 2003–2021 || 08 Aug 2021 || 73 || align=left | — || 
|- id="2003 YL118" bgcolor=#FFC2E0
| 0 ||  || APO || 21.83 || data-sort-value="0.15" | 150 m || multiple || 2003–2022 || 03 Jan 2022 || 110 || align=left | Potentially hazardous object || 
|- id="2003 YX118" bgcolor=#E9E9E9
| 0 ||  || MBA-M || 16.66 || 2.0 km || multiple || 2001–2021 || 31 Mar 2021 || 199 || align=left | — || 
|- id="2003 YP119" bgcolor=#d6d6d6
| 0 ||  || MBA-O || 16.97 || 2.2 km || multiple || 2003–2021 || 02 Apr 2021 || 139 || align=left | Alt.: 2015 DH105 || 
|- id="2003 YA120" bgcolor=#E9E9E9
| 3 ||  || MBA-M || 16.6 || 1.4 km || multiple || 2003–2021 || 06 Apr 2021 || 46 || align=left | Alt.: 2007 YP6 || 
|- id="2003 YV121" bgcolor=#d6d6d6
| 0 ||  || MBA-O || 16.14 || 3.3 km || multiple || 2003–2021 || 02 May 2021 || 142 || align=left | — || 
|- id="2003 YW123" bgcolor=#fefefe
| 0 ||  || MBA-I || 18.26 || data-sort-value="0.66" | 660 m || multiple || 2001–2021 || 06 May 2021 || 93 || align=left | Disc.: LPL/Spacewatch IIAdded on 9 March 2021 || 
|- id="2003 YJ124" bgcolor=#E9E9E9
| 0 ||  || MBA-M || 16.2 || 2.4 km || multiple || 2003–2021 || 17 Jan 2021 || 116 || align=left | Alt.: 2006 OB18, 2010 MV3, 2019 QH8 || 
|- id="2003 YK124" bgcolor=#E9E9E9
| 0 ||  || MBA-M || 17.95 || 1.1 km || multiple || 2003–2021 || 13 May 2021 || 115 || align=left | — || 
|- id="2003 YM124" bgcolor=#E9E9E9
| 0 ||  || MBA-M || 18.09 || data-sort-value="0.72" | 720 m || multiple || 2003–2021 || 09 Apr 2021 || 74 || align=left | — || 
|- id="2003 YW124" bgcolor=#FA8072
| 0 ||  || HUN || 18.04 || data-sort-value="0.73" | 730 m || multiple || 2003–2022 || 18 Jan 2022 || 234 || align=left | — || 
|- id="2003 YK132" bgcolor=#FA8072
| 1 ||  || MCA || 19.5 || data-sort-value="0.37" | 370 m || multiple || 2003–2021 || 11 Mar 2021 || 71 || align=left | Disc.: LINEARAdded on 11 May 2021Alt.: 2013 TA213 || 
|- id="2003 YG136" bgcolor=#FFC2E0
| 7 ||  || ATE || 25.3 || data-sort-value="0.031" | 31 m || single || 4 days || 01 Jan 2004 || 21 || align=left | — || 
|- id="2003 YH136" bgcolor=#FFC2E0
| 7 ||  || APO || 19.4 || data-sort-value="0.47" | 470 m || single || 14 days || 11 Jan 2004 || 33 || align=left | Potentially hazardous object || 
|- id="2003 YJ136" bgcolor=#FA8072
| 6 ||  || MCA || 20.4 || data-sort-value="0.25" | 250 m || single || 21 days || 19 Jan 2004 || 28 || align=left | — || 
|- id="2003 YG139" bgcolor=#d6d6d6
| 0 ||  || MBA-O || 15.9 || 3.7 km || multiple || 2003–2021 || 19 Jan 2021 || 278 || align=left | — || 
|- id="2003 YR139" bgcolor=#E9E9E9
| 0 ||  || MBA-M || 16.50 || 1.5 km || multiple || 2003–2021 || 17 May 2021 || 77 || align=left | Disc.: LINEARAdded on 17 January 2021 || 
|- id="2003 YQ140" bgcolor=#E9E9E9
| 1 ||  || MBA-M || 16.9 || 1.2 km || multiple || 2003–2020 || 14 May 2020 || 75 || align=left | Alt.: 2006 UH294, 2014 OJ278 || 
|- id="2003 YA141" bgcolor=#E9E9E9
| 0 ||  || MBA-M || 16.7 || 1.4 km || multiple || 2003–2021 || 09 Jun 2021 || 230 || align=left | — || 
|- id="2003 YV141" bgcolor=#E9E9E9
| 2 ||  || MBA-M || 17.13 || 1.1 km || multiple || 2003–2021 || 15 Apr 2021 || 42 || align=left | — || 
|- id="2003 YY141" bgcolor=#E9E9E9
| 0 ||  || MBA-M || 17.55 || data-sort-value="0.92" | 920 m || multiple || 2003–2021 || 08 Apr 2021 || 117 || align=left | — || 
|- id="2003 YH142" bgcolor=#E9E9E9
| 0 ||  || MBA-M || 17.41 || data-sort-value="0.98" | 980 m || multiple || 2003–2021 || 03 May 2021 || 124 || align=left | — || 
|- id="2003 YF148" bgcolor=#E9E9E9
| 0 ||  || MBA-M || 16.8 || 1.3 km || multiple || 2002–2021 || 09 Jun 2021 || 95 || align=left | Alt.: 2002 QQ128 || 
|- id="2003 YC150" bgcolor=#d6d6d6
| 0 ||  || MBA-O || 16.9 || 2.3 km || multiple || 2003–2020 || 13 May 2020 || 152 || align=left | — || 
|- id="2003 YA152" bgcolor=#FA8072
| 2 ||  || MCA || 19.3 || data-sort-value="0.41" | 410 m || multiple || 2003–2019 || 09 Feb 2019 || 79 || align=left | Alt.: 2018 VN4 || 
|- id="2003 YH152" bgcolor=#d6d6d6
| 0 ||  || MBA-O || 16.96 || 2.3 km || multiple || 2003–2021 || 17 Apr 2021 || 73 || align=left | — || 
|- id="2003 YH153" bgcolor=#FA8072
| 1 ||  || MCA || 18.6 || data-sort-value="0.57" | 570 m || multiple || 2003–2017 || 11 Oct 2017 || 84 || align=left | — || 
|- id="2003 YW155" bgcolor=#E9E9E9
| 0 ||  || MBA-M || 17.09 || 2.1 km || multiple || 1994–2022 || 21 Jan 2022 || 77 || align=left | — || 
|- id="2003 YC157" bgcolor=#d6d6d6
| 0 ||  || MBA-O || 17.1 || 2.1 km || multiple || 2003–2021 || 14 Jan 2021 || 88 || align=left | — || 
|- id="2003 YF157" bgcolor=#E9E9E9
| 0 ||  || MBA-M || 17.49 || 1.8 km || multiple || 2000–2021 || 27 Nov 2021 || 70 || align=left | Alt.: 2019 JN31 || 
|- id="2003 YK157" bgcolor=#C2FFFF
| 0 ||  || JT || 13.58 || 11 km || multiple || 2001–2021 || 30 Jul 2021 || 213 || align=left | Trojan camp (L5) || 
|- id="2003 YZ161" bgcolor=#d6d6d6
| 0 ||  || MBA-O || 16.7 || 2.5 km || multiple || 2003–2021 || 18 Mar 2021 || 94 || align=left | Disc.: SpacewatchAdded on 11 May 2021Alt.: 2015 AQ51 || 
|- id="2003 YM162" bgcolor=#E9E9E9
| 0 ||  || MBA-M || 16.17 || 1.7 km || multiple || 2001–2021 || 02 Apr 2021 || 278 || align=left | Alt.: 2010 EN3 || 
|- id="2003 YX162" bgcolor=#d6d6d6
| 0 ||  || MBA-O || 15.7 || 4.0 km || multiple || 2003–2021 || 18 Jan 2021 || 137 || align=left | Alt.: 2010 HJ36 || 
|- id="2003 YA164" bgcolor=#d6d6d6
| 2 ||  || MBA-O || 17.1 || 2.1 km || multiple || 2003–2020 || 17 Dec 2020 || 51 || align=left | Disc.: SpacewatchAdded on 17 January 2021 || 
|- id="2003 YT165" bgcolor=#E9E9E9
| 2 ||  || MBA-M || 18.1 || data-sort-value="0.71" | 710 m || multiple || 2003–2019 || 17 Dec 2019 || 43 || align=left | — || 
|- id="2003 YB166" bgcolor=#d6d6d6
| 0 ||  || MBA-O || 16.6 || 2.7 km || multiple || 2002–2021 || 18 Jan 2021 || 94 || align=left | — || 
|- id="2003 YR166" bgcolor=#fefefe
| 0 ||  || MBA-I || 18.3 || data-sort-value="0.65" | 650 m || multiple || 1996–2020 || 09 Sep 2020 || 95 || align=left | Alt.: 2013 QH47 || 
|- id="2003 YA167" bgcolor=#E9E9E9
| 0 ||  || MBA-M || 17.9 || 1.1 km || multiple || 2003–2020 || 16 Oct 2020 || 67 || align=left | — || 
|- id="2003 YW170" bgcolor=#E9E9E9
| 0 ||  || MBA-M || 16.94 || 2.3 km || multiple || 2003–2021 || 28 Dec 2021 || 160 || align=left | Alt.: 2007 VQ206 || 
|- id="2003 YB172" bgcolor=#E9E9E9
| 0 ||  || MBA-M || 17.87 || data-sort-value="0.79" | 790 m || multiple || 2003–2021 || 12 May 2021 || 96 || align=left | Alt.: 2014 OC68, 2015 XU171 || 
|- id="2003 YH173" bgcolor=#d6d6d6
| 0 ||  || MBA-O || 16.9 || 2.3 km || multiple || 2003–2020 || 21 Apr 2020 || 45 || align=left | — || 
|- id="2003 YV173" bgcolor=#d6d6d6
| 0 ||  || MBA-O || 17.53 || 1.7 km || multiple || 2003–2021 || 09 Apr 2021 || 53 || align=left | Alt.: 2010 KC77 || 
|- id="2003 YX173" bgcolor=#E9E9E9
| 0 ||  || MBA-M || 16.8 || 1.8 km || multiple || 2003–2021 || 13 Jan 2021 || 105 || align=left | Alt.: 2007 VL371 || 
|- id="2003 YU174" bgcolor=#E9E9E9
| 0 ||  || MBA-M || 16.73 || 1.9 km || multiple || 2003–2021 || 01 Apr 2021 || 207 || align=left | Alt.: 2013 GM13 || 
|- id="2003 YY174" bgcolor=#fefefe
| 0 ||  || MBA-I || 17.88 || data-sort-value="0.79" | 790 m || multiple || 2003–2021 || 06 Nov 2021 || 103 || align=left | Alt.: 2008 CQ153, 2014 YW47 || 
|- id="2003 YF176" bgcolor=#E9E9E9
| 0 ||  || MBA-M || 17.7 || 1.6 km || multiple || 2003–2020 || 22 Sep 2020 || 59 || align=left | Disc.: Mauna Kea Obs.Added on 19 October 2020 || 
|- id="2003 YG176" bgcolor=#fefefe
| 0 ||  || MBA-I || 19.5 || data-sort-value="0.37" | 370 m || multiple || 2003–2021 || 12 Aug 2021 || 33 || align=left | Disc.: Mauna Kea Obs.Added on 21 August 2021Alt.: 2014 WQ14 || 
|- id="2003 YH176" bgcolor=#d6d6d6
| 1 ||  || MBA-O || 17.3 || 1.9 km || multiple || 2003–2021 || 04 Jan 2021 || 43 || align=left | Alt.: 2005 GJ195, 2010 AA18 || 
|- id="2003 YL176" bgcolor=#fefefe
| 0 ||  || MBA-I || 18.5 || data-sort-value="0.59" | 590 m || multiple || 2002–2020 || 13 Sep 2020 || 67 || align=left | — || 
|- id="2003 YT176" bgcolor=#d6d6d6
| 0 ||  || MBA-O || 17.47 || 1.8 km || multiple || 2003–2021 || 16 Jan 2021 || 58 || align=left | Disc.: Mauna Kea Obs.Added on 30 September 2021Alt.: 2005 EH312, 2014 WN457 || 
|- id="2003 YV176" bgcolor=#d6d6d6
| 0 ||  || MBA-O || 17.31 || 1.9 km || multiple || 2000–2021 || 11 Sep 2021 || 142 || align=left | Alt.: 2017 SK114 || 
|- id="2003 YY176" bgcolor=#E9E9E9
| 0 ||  || MBA-M || 18.23 || 1.3 km || multiple || 2003–2021 || 07 Nov 2021 || 41 || align=left | Disc.: Mauna Kea Obs.Added on 22 July 2020 || 
|- id="2003 YB177" bgcolor=#E9E9E9
| 0 ||  || MBA-M || 18.2 || data-sort-value="0.68" | 680 m || multiple || 2003–2021 || 13 Feb 2021 || 40 || align=left | Disc.: Mauna Kea Obs.Added on 9 March 2021 || 
|- id="2003 YK177" bgcolor=#E9E9E9
| 0 ||  || MBA-M || 17.9 || 1.5 km || multiple || 2003–2021 || 07 Nov 2021 || 26 || align=left | Disc.: Mauna Kea Obs.Added on 29 January 2022 || 
|- id="2003 YU177" bgcolor=#E9E9E9
| 0 ||  || MBA-M || 17.3 || 1.5 km || multiple || 2003–2021 || 18 Jan 2021 || 115 || align=left | — || 
|- id="2003 YN178" bgcolor=#E9E9E9
| 0 ||  || MBA-M || 18.16 || data-sort-value="0.98" | 980 m || multiple || 2003–2022 || 25 Jan 2022 || 48 || align=left | — || 
|- id="2003 YP178" bgcolor=#d6d6d6
| 0 ||  || MBA-O || 16.5 || 2.8 km || multiple || 2003–2020 || 22 Dec 2020 || 49 || align=left | — || 
|- id="2003 YJ179" bgcolor=#C2E0FF
| 2 ||  || TNO || 7.1 || 126 km || multiple || 2003–2019 || 08 Feb 2019 || 28 || align=left | LoUTNOs, cubewano (cold) || 
|- id="2003 YK179" bgcolor=#C2E0FF
| 2 ||  || TNO || 7.5 || 132 km || multiple || 2003–2012 || 14 Nov 2012 || 19 || align=left | LoUTNOs, other TNO || 
|- id="2003 YM179" bgcolor=#C2E0FF
| 3 ||  || TNO || 8.0 || 105 km || multiple || 2003–2020 || 18 Feb 2020 || 12 || align=left | LoUTNOs, other TNO || 
|- id="2003 YN179" bgcolor=#C2E0FF
| 3 ||  || TNO || 6.8 || 145 km || multiple || 2002–2013 || 06 Nov 2013 || 19 || align=left | LoUTNOs, cubewano (cold) || 
|- id="2003 YP179" bgcolor=#C2E0FF
| 4 ||  || TNO || 7.35 || 113 km || multiple || 2003–2021 || 11 Jan 2021 || 22 || align=left | LoUTNOs, cubewano (cold) || 
|- id="2003 YQ179" bgcolor=#C2E0FF
| 2 ||  || TNO || 7.07 || 145 km || multiple || 2003–2021 || 20 Mar 2021 || 105 || align=left | LoUTNOs, SDO || 
|- id="2003 YR179" bgcolor=#C2E0FF
| 2 ||  || TNO || 7.1 || 195 km || multiple || 2003–2019 || 08 Feb 2019 || 16 || align=left | LoUTNOs, cubewano (hot) || 
|- id="2003 YS179" bgcolor=#C2E0FF
| 2 ||  || TNO || 6.8 || 109 km || multiple || 2003–2020 || 04 Jan 2020 || 23 || align=left | LoUTNOs, cubewano (cold), binary: 95 km || 
|- id="2003 YT179" bgcolor=#C2E0FF
| 2 ||  || TNO || 7.1 || 126 km || multiple || 2003–2020 || 18 Feb 2020 || 19 || align=left | LoUTNOs, cubewano (cold) || 
|- id="2003 YU179" bgcolor=#C2E0FF
| 3 ||  || TNO || 6.92 || 137 km || multiple || 2003–2021 || 20 Mar 2021 || 36 || align=left | LoUTNOs, cubewano (cold), binary: 88 km || 
|- id="2003 YV179" bgcolor=#C2E0FF
| 5 ||  || TNO || 6.99 || 166 km || multiple || 2003–2021 || 11 Jan 2021 || 21 || align=left | LoUTNOs, other TNO || 
|- id="2003 YX179" bgcolor=#C2E0FF
| 3 ||  || TNO || 7.0 || 132 km || multiple || 2003–2020 || 04 Jan 2020 || 20 || align=left | LoUTNOs, cubewano (cold) || 
|- id="2003 YY179" bgcolor=#C2E0FF
| E ||  || TNO || 9.1 || 72 km || single || 74 days || 16 Dec 2003 || 6 || align=left | LoUTNOs, plutino? || 
|- id="2003 YZ179" bgcolor=#C2E0FF
| E ||  || TNO || 7.6 || 104 km || single || 113 days || 15 Apr 2004 || 5 || align=left | LoUTNOs, cubewano? || 
|- id="2003 YB181" bgcolor=#d6d6d6
| 0 ||  || MBA-O || 17.1 || 3.4 km || multiple || 2003–2020 || 18 Apr 2020 || 131 || align=left | — || 
|- id="2003 YZ182" bgcolor=#d6d6d6
| 0 ||  || MBA-O || 16.71 || 2.5 km || multiple || 2003–2021 || 17 Apr 2021 || 86 || align=left | — || 
|- id="2003 YA183" bgcolor=#d6d6d6
| 0 ||  || MBA-O || 16.38 || 2.9 km || multiple || 2003–2021 || 20 May 2021 || 139 || align=left | — || 
|- id="2003 YB183" bgcolor=#E9E9E9
| 0 ||  || MBA-M || 17.28 || 1.5 km || multiple || 2003–2021 || 06 May 2021 || 214 || align=left | — || 
|- id="2003 YC183" bgcolor=#fefefe
| 0 ||  || MBA-I || 18.16 || data-sort-value="0.69" | 690 m || multiple || 2003–2021 || 01 Nov 2021 || 149 || align=left | — || 
|- id="2003 YE183" bgcolor=#fefefe
| 0 ||  || MBA-I || 17.65 || data-sort-value="0.88" | 880 m || multiple || 2003–2021 || 09 May 2021 || 129 || align=left | — || 
|- id="2003 YK183" bgcolor=#E9E9E9
| 0 ||  || MBA-M || 17.48 || 1.8 km || multiple || 2003–2021 || 02 Dec 2021 || 119 || align=left | — || 
|- id="2003 YP183" bgcolor=#fefefe
| 0 ||  || MBA-I || 18.1 || data-sort-value="0.71" | 710 m || multiple || 2003–2020 || 23 Mar 2020 || 79 || align=left | — || 
|- id="2003 YR183" bgcolor=#d6d6d6
| 0 ||  || MBA-O || 16.55 || 2.7 km || multiple || 2003–2021 || 09 May 2021 || 128 || align=left | — || 
|- id="2003 YT183" bgcolor=#fefefe
| 0 ||  || MBA-I || 18.3 || data-sort-value="0.65" | 650 m || multiple || 2003–2021 || 18 Jan 2021 || 90 || align=left | — || 
|- id="2003 YV183" bgcolor=#E9E9E9
| 0 ||  || MBA-M || 17.10 || 1.1 km || multiple || 2003–2021 || 01 May 2021 || 140 || align=left | — || 
|- id="2003 YW183" bgcolor=#fefefe
| 0 ||  || MBA-I || 17.69 || data-sort-value="0.86" | 860 m || multiple || 2002–2022 || 24 Jan 2022 || 175 || align=left | — || 
|- id="2003 YY183" bgcolor=#d6d6d6
| 0 ||  || MBA-O || 16.47 || 2.8 km || multiple || 2003–2021 || 03 May 2021 || 125 || align=left | — || 
|- id="2003 YZ183" bgcolor=#fefefe
| 0 ||  || MBA-I || 17.88 || data-sort-value="0.79" | 790 m || multiple || 2003–2021 || 10 May 2021 || 122 || align=left | — || 
|- id="2003 YA184" bgcolor=#fefefe
| 1 ||  || MBA-I || 18.4 || data-sort-value="0.62" | 620 m || multiple || 2003–2021 || 05 Jan 2021 || 162 || align=left | — || 
|- id="2003 YB184" bgcolor=#fefefe
| 0 ||  || MBA-I || 18.4 || data-sort-value="0.62" | 620 m || multiple || 2003–2020 || 22 Apr 2020 || 61 || align=left | — || 
|- id="2003 YG184" bgcolor=#d6d6d6
| 0 ||  || MBA-O || 16.3 || 3.1 km || multiple || 2003–2021 || 15 Jan 2021 || 94 || align=left | — || 
|- id="2003 YH184" bgcolor=#E9E9E9
| 0 ||  || MBA-M || 17.29 || 1.9 km || multiple || 2003–2021 || 30 Nov 2021 || 100 || align=left | — || 
|- id="2003 YK184" bgcolor=#d6d6d6
| 0 ||  || MBA-O || 16.1 || 3.4 km || multiple || 2003–2021 || 17 Jan 2021 || 107 || align=left | — || 
|- id="2003 YL184" bgcolor=#fefefe
| 0 ||  || MBA-I || 17.42 || data-sort-value="0.98" | 980 m || multiple || 2003–2021 || 15 May 2021 || 141 || align=left | — || 
|- id="2003 YM184" bgcolor=#E9E9E9
| 0 ||  || MBA-M || 18.0 || data-sort-value="0.75" | 750 m || multiple || 2003–2021 || 14 Jan 2021 || 74 || align=left | — || 
|- id="2003 YO184" bgcolor=#d6d6d6
| 0 ||  || MBA-O || 16.4 || 2.9 km || multiple || 2003–2021 || 17 Jan 2021 || 111 || align=left | — || 
|- id="2003 YP184" bgcolor=#E9E9E9
| 0 ||  || MBA-M || 17.66 || 1.6 km || multiple || 2003–2021 || 29 Dec 2021 || 82 || align=left | — || 
|- id="2003 YQ184" bgcolor=#fefefe
| 0 ||  || MBA-I || 18.0 || data-sort-value="0.75" | 750 m || multiple || 2003–2020 || 15 Dec 2020 || 95 || align=left | — || 
|- id="2003 YR184" bgcolor=#E9E9E9
| 0 ||  || MBA-M || 17.1 || 1.6 km || multiple || 2003–2021 || 05 Jan 2021 || 84 || align=left | — || 
|- id="2003 YS184" bgcolor=#d6d6d6
| 0 ||  || MBA-O || 16.6 || 2.7 km || multiple || 2003–2021 || 06 Jan 2021 || 93 || align=left | — || 
|- id="2003 YT184" bgcolor=#E9E9E9
| 0 ||  || MBA-M || 17.2 || 1.5 km || multiple || 2003–2021 || 11 Jan 2021 || 149 || align=left | — || 
|- id="2003 YU184" bgcolor=#fefefe
| 1 ||  || MBA-I || 18.8 || data-sort-value="0.52" | 520 m || multiple || 2003–2017 || 13 Nov 2017 || 56 || align=left | — || 
|- id="2003 YV184" bgcolor=#d6d6d6
| 0 ||  || MBA-O || 17.29 || 1.9 km || multiple || 2003–2021 || 06 Oct 2021 || 61 || align=left | — || 
|- id="2003 YY184" bgcolor=#FA8072
| 0 ||  || MCA || 17.9 || data-sort-value="0.78" | 780 m || multiple || 2003–2020 || 22 Jul 2020 || 54 || align=left | — || 
|- id="2003 YZ184" bgcolor=#fefefe
| 0 ||  || HUN || 18.3 || data-sort-value="0.65" | 650 m || multiple || 2003–2021 || 08 Jan 2021 || 58 || align=left | — || 
|- id="2003 YA185" bgcolor=#fefefe
| 0 ||  || MBA-I || 18.5 || data-sort-value="0.59" | 590 m || multiple || 2003–2020 || 16 Dec 2020 || 75 || align=left | — || 
|- id="2003 YB185" bgcolor=#d6d6d6
| 0 ||  || MBA-O || 16.3 || 3.1 km || multiple || 2003–2021 || 13 Jan 2021 || 56 || align=left | — || 
|- id="2003 YD185" bgcolor=#fefefe
| 0 ||  || MBA-I || 18.52 || data-sort-value="0.59" | 590 m || multiple || 2003–2022 || 07 Jan 2022 || 124 || align=left | — || 
|- id="2003 YF185" bgcolor=#fefefe
| 0 ||  || MBA-I || 18.5 || data-sort-value="0.59" | 590 m || multiple || 2003–2021 || 23 Jan 2021 || 79 || align=left | — || 
|- id="2003 YG185" bgcolor=#fefefe
| 0 ||  || MBA-I || 18.5 || data-sort-value="0.59" | 590 m || multiple || 2003–2020 || 22 Sep 2020 || 90 || align=left | — || 
|- id="2003 YH185" bgcolor=#E9E9E9
| 0 ||  || MBA-M || 17.7 || 1.2 km || multiple || 2003–2020 || 05 Nov 2020 || 59 || align=left | — || 
|- id="2003 YJ185" bgcolor=#d6d6d6
| 0 ||  || MBA-O || 16.7 || 2.5 km || multiple || 2003–2021 || 17 Jan 2021 || 94 || align=left | — || 
|- id="2003 YK185" bgcolor=#d6d6d6
| 0 ||  || MBA-O || 15.9 || 3.7 km || multiple || 2003–2021 || 18 Jan 2021 || 129 || align=left | Alt.: 2010 JU6 || 
|- id="2003 YL185" bgcolor=#E9E9E9
| 0 ||  || MBA-M || 17.16 || 1.1 km || multiple || 2003–2021 || 09 May 2021 || 138 || align=left | — || 
|- id="2003 YM185" bgcolor=#fefefe
| 0 ||  || MBA-I || 18.43 || data-sort-value="0.61" | 610 m || multiple || 2003–2021 || 14 Jun 2021 || 74 || align=left | — || 
|- id="2003 YN185" bgcolor=#d6d6d6
| 0 ||  || MBA-O || 16.95 || 2.3 km || multiple || 2003–2021 || 09 May 2021 || 55 || align=left | — || 
|- id="2003 YO185" bgcolor=#E9E9E9
| 0 ||  || MBA-M || 17.79 || 1.5 km || multiple || 2003–2022 || 05 Jan 2022 || 118 || align=left | — || 
|- id="2003 YP185" bgcolor=#E9E9E9
| 0 ||  || MBA-M || 16.7 || 1.4 km || multiple || 2002–2019 || 30 Dec 2019 || 68 || align=left | — || 
|- id="2003 YQ185" bgcolor=#fefefe
| 0 ||  || MBA-I || 18.4 || data-sort-value="0.62" | 620 m || multiple || 2003–2019 || 24 Dec 2019 || 59 || align=left | — || 
|- id="2003 YS185" bgcolor=#fefefe
| 0 ||  || HUN || 18.00 || data-sort-value="0.75" | 750 m || multiple || 2003–2021 || 07 May 2021 || 133 || align=left | — || 
|- id="2003 YT185" bgcolor=#E9E9E9
| 0 ||  || MBA-M || 17.29 || 1.5 km || multiple || 2003–2022 || 27 Jan 2022 || 122 || align=left | — || 
|- id="2003 YU185" bgcolor=#fefefe
| 0 ||  || MBA-I || 18.7 || data-sort-value="0.54" | 540 m || multiple || 1996–2020 || 08 Dec 2020 || 84 || align=left | — || 
|- id="2003 YV185" bgcolor=#d6d6d6
| 0 ||  || MBA-O || 16.6 || 2.7 km || multiple || 2003–2021 || 18 Jan 2021 || 58 || align=left | — || 
|- id="2003 YW185" bgcolor=#E9E9E9
| 0 ||  || MBA-M || 17.95 || 1.4 km || multiple || 2003–2021 || 01 Nov 2021 || 59 || align=left | — || 
|- id="2003 YX185" bgcolor=#E9E9E9
| 0 ||  || MBA-M || 16.87 || 1.8 km || multiple || 2000–2022 || 19 Jan 2022 || 94 || align=left | — || 
|- id="2003 YY185" bgcolor=#fefefe
| 0 ||  || MBA-I || 19.25 || data-sort-value="0.42" | 420 m || multiple || 2003–2022 || 25 Jan 2022 || 51 || align=left | — || 
|- id="2003 YZ185" bgcolor=#fefefe
| 0 ||  || MBA-I || 18.56 || data-sort-value="0.58" | 580 m || multiple || 2003–2021 || 30 Nov 2021 || 85 || align=left | — || 
|- id="2003 YA186" bgcolor=#E9E9E9
| 0 ||  || MBA-M || 17.1 || 1.1 km || multiple || 2003–2021 || 21 Jan 2021 || 56 || align=left | — || 
|- id="2003 YB186" bgcolor=#fefefe
| 0 ||  || MBA-I || 18.7 || data-sort-value="0.54" | 540 m || multiple || 2003–2020 || 10 Oct 2020 || 60 || align=left | — || 
|- id="2003 YD186" bgcolor=#fefefe
| 0 ||  || MBA-I || 18.70 || data-sort-value="0.54" | 540 m || multiple || 2003–2021 || 08 Dec 2021 || 59 || align=left | — || 
|- id="2003 YE186" bgcolor=#E9E9E9
| 0 ||  || MBA-M || 17.5 || 1.3 km || multiple || 2003–2020 || 19 Nov 2020 || 72 || align=left | Alt.: 2013 AJ170 || 
|- id="2003 YF186" bgcolor=#FA8072
| 1 ||  || MCA || 18.2 || data-sort-value="0.68" | 680 m || multiple || 2003–2018 || 05 Jan 2018 || 35 || align=left | — || 
|- id="2003 YH186" bgcolor=#d6d6d6
| 0 ||  || MBA-O || 16.8 || 2.4 km || multiple || 2003–2021 || 22 Jan 2021 || 81 || align=left | Alt.: 2010 HX35 || 
|- id="2003 YJ186" bgcolor=#d6d6d6
| 0 ||  || MBA-O || 16.66 || 2.6 km || multiple || 2003–2021 || 11 May 2021 || 106 || align=left | Alt.: 2010 JY12 || 
|- id="2003 YK186" bgcolor=#fefefe
| 1 ||  || MBA-I || 18.4 || data-sort-value="0.62" | 620 m || multiple || 2003–2019 || 21 Aug 2019 || 30 || align=left | — || 
|- id="2003 YL186" bgcolor=#fefefe
| 0 ||  || MBA-I || 18.19 || data-sort-value="0.68" | 680 m || multiple || 2003–2021 || 05 Nov 2021 || 91 || align=left | — || 
|- id="2003 YM186" bgcolor=#d6d6d6
| 0 ||  || MBA-O || 17.37 || 1.9 km || multiple || 2003–2021 || 19 May 2021 || 81 || align=left | — || 
|- id="2003 YN186" bgcolor=#fefefe
| 0 ||  || MBA-I || 18.2 || data-sort-value="0.68" | 680 m || multiple || 1996–2020 || 17 Oct 2020 || 62 || align=left | — || 
|- id="2003 YP186" bgcolor=#fefefe
| 0 ||  || HUN || 18.3 || data-sort-value="0.65" | 650 m || multiple || 2003–2019 || 04 Nov 2019 || 55 || align=left | — || 
|- id="2003 YQ186" bgcolor=#E9E9E9
| 1 ||  || MBA-M || 17.7 || 1.2 km || multiple || 2003–2016 || 10 Nov 2016 || 23 || align=left | — || 
|- id="2003 YR186" bgcolor=#d6d6d6
| 0 ||  || MBA-O || 16.49 || 2.8 km || multiple || 2003–2021 || 14 Apr 2021 || 159 || align=left | — || 
|- id="2003 YS186" bgcolor=#d6d6d6
| 0 ||  || MBA-O || 15.9 || 3.7 km || multiple || 2003–2021 || 18 Jan 2021 || 139 || align=left | — || 
|- id="2003 YT186" bgcolor=#d6d6d6
| 0 ||  || MBA-O || 16.18 || 3.2 km || multiple || 2003–2021 || 09 Jun 2021 || 137 || align=left | — || 
|- id="2003 YU186" bgcolor=#E9E9E9
| 0 ||  || MBA-M || 17.80 || data-sort-value="0.82" | 820 m || multiple || 2003–2021 || 10 May 2021 || 97 || align=left | — || 
|- id="2003 YW186" bgcolor=#fefefe
| 1 ||  || MBA-I || 18.0 || data-sort-value="0.75" | 750 m || multiple || 2003–2019 || 25 Nov 2019 || 87 || align=left | — || 
|- id="2003 YY186" bgcolor=#d6d6d6
| 0 ||  || MBA-O || 16.1 || 3.4 km || multiple || 2003–2020 || 23 Dec 2020 || 94 || align=left | — || 
|- id="2003 YZ186" bgcolor=#d6d6d6
| 0 ||  || MBA-O || 16.6 || 2.7 km || multiple || 2003–2021 || 17 Jan 2021 || 86 || align=left | — || 
|- id="2003 YA187" bgcolor=#E9E9E9
| 0 ||  || MBA-M || 17.3 || 1.5 km || multiple || 2003–2020 || 16 Nov 2020 || 117 || align=left | — || 
|- id="2003 YC187" bgcolor=#d6d6d6
| 0 ||  || MBA-O || 16.6 || 2.7 km || multiple || 2003–2021 || 18 Jan 2021 || 71 || align=left | — || 
|- id="2003 YD187" bgcolor=#d6d6d6
| 0 ||  || MBA-O || 17.0 || 2.2 km || multiple || 2003–2020 || 25 May 2020 || 70 || align=left | — || 
|- id="2003 YE187" bgcolor=#d6d6d6
| 0 ||  || MBA-O || 16.0 || 3.5 km || multiple || 2003–2021 || 04 Jan 2021 || 91 || align=left | — || 
|- id="2003 YF187" bgcolor=#E9E9E9
| 0 ||  || MBA-M || 17.84 || data-sort-value="0.80" | 800 m || multiple || 2003–2021 || 17 Apr 2021 || 73 || align=left | — || 
|- id="2003 YG187" bgcolor=#d6d6d6
| 0 ||  || MBA-O || 16.62 || 2.6 km || multiple || 2003–2021 || 14 May 2021 || 121 || align=left | Alt.: 2010 KD20 || 
|- id="2003 YH187" bgcolor=#d6d6d6
| 0 ||  || MBA-O || 16.9 || 2.3 km || multiple || 2003–2019 || 08 Feb 2019 || 62 || align=left | — || 
|- id="2003 YJ187" bgcolor=#E9E9E9
| 1 ||  || MBA-M || 17.7 || data-sort-value="0.86" | 860 m || multiple || 2003–2019 || 20 Dec 2019 || 60 || align=left | — || 
|- id="2003 YK187" bgcolor=#d6d6d6
| 0 ||  || MBA-O || 16.22 || 3.2 km || multiple || 1993–2021 || 04 May 2021 || 167 || align=left | — || 
|- id="2003 YM187" bgcolor=#d6d6d6
| 0 ||  || MBA-O || 16.8 || 2.4 km || multiple || 2003–2021 || 18 Jan 2021 || 73 || align=left | — || 
|- id="2003 YN187" bgcolor=#fefefe
| 0 ||  || MBA-I || 17.98 || data-sort-value="0.75" | 750 m || multiple || 1993–2021 || 10 Dec 2021 || 135 || align=left | Alt.: 1993 BM9 || 
|- id="2003 YO187" bgcolor=#d6d6d6
| 0 ||  || MBA-O || 16.6 || 2.7 km || multiple || 2003–2020 || 22 Dec 2020 || 69 || align=left | — || 
|- id="2003 YQ187" bgcolor=#d6d6d6
| 0 ||  || MBA-O || 17.0 || 2.2 km || multiple || 2002–2020 || 21 Jan 2020 || 72 || align=left | — || 
|- id="2003 YR187" bgcolor=#E9E9E9
| 0 ||  || MBA-M || 17.70 || 1.6 km || multiple || 2003–2021 || 13 Sep 2021 || 58 || align=left | — || 
|- id="2003 YS187" bgcolor=#E9E9E9
| 0 ||  || MBA-M || 16.7 || 1.9 km || multiple || 2003–2021 || 06 Jan 2021 || 74 || align=left | — || 
|- id="2003 YT187" bgcolor=#d6d6d6
| 0 ||  || MBA-O || 16.76 || 2.5 km || multiple || 2003–2021 || 10 May 2021 || 94 || align=left | — || 
|- id="2003 YU187" bgcolor=#d6d6d6
| 0 ||  || MBA-O || 16.6 || 2.7 km || multiple || 2003–2021 || 09 Jan 2021 || 53 || align=left | — || 
|- id="2003 YW187" bgcolor=#fefefe
| 0 ||  || MBA-I || 18.05 || data-sort-value="0.73" | 730 m || multiple || 2003–2021 || 06 Nov 2021 || 99 || align=left | — || 
|- id="2003 YX187" bgcolor=#fefefe
| 0 ||  || MBA-I || 17.9 || data-sort-value="0.78" | 780 m || multiple || 2003–2020 || 16 Apr 2020 || 54 || align=left | — || 
|- id="2003 YY187" bgcolor=#E9E9E9
| 0 ||  || MBA-M || 17.91 || data-sort-value="0.78" | 780 m || multiple || 2003–2021 || 08 May 2021 || 71 || align=left | — || 
|- id="2003 YZ187" bgcolor=#d6d6d6
| 0 ||  || MBA-O || 17.86 || 1.5 km || multiple || 2003–2019 || 07 May 2019 || 48 || align=left | — || 
|- id="2003 YA188" bgcolor=#fefefe
| 0 ||  || MBA-I || 18.95 || data-sort-value="0.48" | 480 m || multiple || 2003–2021 || 05 Jun 2021 || 49 || align=left | — || 
|- id="2003 YB188" bgcolor=#d6d6d6
| 0 ||  || MBA-O || 17.06 || 2.2 km || multiple || 2003–2021 || 03 May 2021 || 70 || align=left | — || 
|- id="2003 YC188" bgcolor=#fefefe
| 0 ||  || MBA-I || 18.31 || data-sort-value="0.65" | 650 m || multiple || 2003–2021 || 07 Nov 2021 || 64 || align=left | — || 
|- id="2003 YD188" bgcolor=#FA8072
| 1 ||  || MCA || 19.3 || data-sort-value="0.41" | 410 m || multiple || 2003–2019 || 03 Jan 2019 || 31 || align=left | — || 
|- id="2003 YE188" bgcolor=#fefefe
| 0 ||  || MBA-I || 17.9 || data-sort-value="0.78" | 780 m || multiple || 2003–2020 || 09 Oct 2020 || 72 || align=left | — || 
|- id="2003 YF188" bgcolor=#fefefe
| 0 ||  || HUN || 18.6 || data-sort-value="0.57" | 570 m || multiple || 2003–2020 || 22 Jan 2020 || 53 || align=left | — || 
|- id="2003 YG188" bgcolor=#E9E9E9
| 1 ||  || MBA-M || 18.20 || data-sort-value="0.68" | 680 m || multiple || 2003–2021 || 06 Apr 2021 || 47 || align=left | — || 
|- id="2003 YH188" bgcolor=#fefefe
| 0 ||  || MBA-I || 18.86 || data-sort-value="0.50" | 500 m || multiple || 2003–2021 || 04 Oct 2021 || 33 || align=left | — || 
|- id="2003 YJ188" bgcolor=#d6d6d6
| 0 ||  || MBA-O || 16.5 || 2.8 km || multiple || 2003–2021 || 07 Jun 2021 || 79 || align=left | — || 
|- id="2003 YK188" bgcolor=#fefefe
| 0 ||  || MBA-I || 18.63 || data-sort-value="0.56" | 560 m || multiple || 2003–2021 || 08 Nov 2021 || 55 || align=left | — || 
|- id="2003 YL188" bgcolor=#d6d6d6
| 2 ||  || MBA-O || 17.6 || 1.7 km || multiple || 2003–2019 || 05 Feb 2019 || 27 || align=left | — || 
|- id="2003 YM188" bgcolor=#E9E9E9
| 2 ||  || MBA-M || 18.8 || data-sort-value="0.52" | 520 m || multiple || 2003–2019 || 25 Sep 2019 || 43 || align=left | Alt.: 2007 VN258 || 
|- id="2003 YQ188" bgcolor=#fefefe
| 0 ||  || MBA-I || 18.1 || data-sort-value="0.71" | 710 m || multiple || 2003–2021 || 18 Jan 2021 || 76 || align=left | — || 
|- id="2003 YR188" bgcolor=#fefefe
| 0 ||  || MBA-I || 17.8 || data-sort-value="0.82" | 820 m || multiple || 2003–2020 || 22 Mar 2020 || 70 || align=left | — || 
|- id="2003 YS188" bgcolor=#d6d6d6
| 0 ||  || MBA-O || 17.1 || 2.1 km || multiple || 2003–2020 || 16 May 2020 || 50 || align=left | — || 
|- id="2003 YU188" bgcolor=#fefefe
| 0 ||  || MBA-I || 18.53 || data-sort-value="0.58" | 580 m || multiple || 2003–2022 || 24 Jan 2022 || 45 || align=left | — || 
|- id="2003 YV188" bgcolor=#E9E9E9
| 0 ||  || MBA-M || 18.1 || data-sort-value="0.71" | 710 m || multiple || 2003–2021 || 23 Jan 2021 || 70 || align=left | — || 
|- id="2003 YW188" bgcolor=#d6d6d6
| 0 ||  || MBA-O || 17.2 || 2.0 km || multiple || 2003–2020 || 18 Apr 2020 || 84 || align=left | Alt.: 2010 BN26 || 
|- id="2003 YX188" bgcolor=#E9E9E9
| 0 ||  || MBA-M || 17.8 || data-sort-value="0.82" | 820 m || multiple || 2003–2020 || 11 Dec 2020 || 65 || align=left | — || 
|- id="2003 YZ188" bgcolor=#fefefe
| 0 ||  || MBA-I || 18.8 || data-sort-value="0.52" | 520 m || multiple || 2003–2019 || 06 Jan 2019 || 44 || align=left | — || 
|- id="2003 YA189" bgcolor=#fefefe
| 0 ||  || MBA-I || 18.3 || data-sort-value="0.65" | 650 m || multiple || 2003–2021 || 18 Jan 2021 || 97 || align=left | — || 
|- id="2003 YB189" bgcolor=#d6d6d6
| 0 ||  || MBA-O || 16.90 || 2.3 km || multiple || 2003–2021 || 09 Apr 2021 || 96 || align=left | Alt.: 2010 JK191 || 
|- id="2003 YC189" bgcolor=#E9E9E9
| 0 ||  || MBA-M || 17.96 || data-sort-value="0.76" | 760 m || multiple || 2003–2021 || 13 May 2021 || 76 || align=left | — || 
|- id="2003 YD189" bgcolor=#E9E9E9
| 1 ||  || MBA-M || 17.7 || data-sort-value="0.86" | 860 m || multiple || 2003–2019 || 08 Nov 2019 || 53 || align=left | — || 
|- id="2003 YE189" bgcolor=#d6d6d6
| 0 ||  || MBA-O || 16.91 || 2.3 km || multiple || 2003–2021 || 02 Apr 2021 || 81 || align=left | Alt.: 2010 HO129 || 
|- id="2003 YF189" bgcolor=#E9E9E9
| 0 ||  || MBA-M || 17.97 || data-sort-value="0.76" | 760 m || multiple || 2003–2021 || 15 Apr 2021 || 88 || align=left | — || 
|- id="2003 YG189" bgcolor=#d6d6d6
| 0 ||  || MBA-O || 16.3 || 3.1 km || multiple || 2003–2021 || 17 Jan 2021 || 64 || align=left | — || 
|- id="2003 YH189" bgcolor=#d6d6d6
| 0 ||  || MBA-O || 17.13 || 2.1 km || multiple || 2003–2021 || 12 May 2021 || 80 || align=left | — || 
|- id="2003 YK189" bgcolor=#d6d6d6
| 0 ||  || MBA-O || 16.7 || 2.5 km || multiple || 1992–2021 || 12 Jan 2021 || 52 || align=left | — || 
|- id="2003 YL189" bgcolor=#fefefe
| 0 ||  || HUN || 18.68 || data-sort-value="0.55" | 550 m || multiple || 2003–2021 || 05 Jul 2021 || 49 || align=left | — || 
|- id="2003 YM189" bgcolor=#E9E9E9
| 0 ||  || MBA-M || 17.63 || 1.3 km || multiple || 2003–2022 || 10 Jan 2022 || 44 || align=left | — || 
|- id="2003 YN189" bgcolor=#fefefe
| 0 ||  || MBA-I || 19.1 || data-sort-value="0.45" | 450 m || multiple || 2003–2019 || 01 Nov 2019 || 66 || align=left | — || 
|- id="2003 YO189" bgcolor=#d6d6d6
| 0 ||  || HIL || 15.9 || 3.7 km || multiple || 2003–2020 || 21 Jan 2020 || 58 || align=left | — || 
|- id="2003 YP189" bgcolor=#fefefe
| 1 ||  || MBA-I || 18.6 || data-sort-value="0.57" | 570 m || multiple || 2003–2020 || 20 Jan 2020 || 57 || align=left | — || 
|- id="2003 YR189" bgcolor=#E9E9E9
| 0 ||  || MBA-M || 18.04 || data-sort-value="0.73" | 730 m || multiple || 2003–2021 || 10 May 2021 || 88 || align=left | — || 
|- id="2003 YS189" bgcolor=#fefefe
| 0 ||  || MBA-I || 17.67 || data-sort-value="0.87" | 870 m || multiple || 2003–2021 || 13 Jul 2021 || 80 || align=left | — || 
|- id="2003 YT189" bgcolor=#E9E9E9
| 0 ||  || MBA-M || 17.2 || 1.1 km || multiple || 2003–2021 || 17 Jan 2021 || 62 || align=left | — || 
|- id="2003 YV189" bgcolor=#d6d6d6
| 0 ||  || MBA-O || 16.9 || 2.3 km || multiple || 2003–2020 || 01 Jan 2020 || 56 || align=left | — || 
|- id="2003 YW189" bgcolor=#fefefe
| 0 ||  || HUN || 18.30 || data-sort-value="0.65" | 650 m || multiple || 2003–2021 || 30 Oct 2021 || 71 || align=left | — || 
|- id="2003 YX189" bgcolor=#E9E9E9
| 0 ||  || MBA-M || 18.16 || data-sort-value="0.69" | 690 m || multiple || 2003–2021 || 08 May 2021 || 41 || align=left | — || 
|- id="2003 YY189" bgcolor=#d6d6d6
| 0 ||  || MBA-O || 17.1 || 2.1 km || multiple || 2003–2017 || 18 May 2017 || 28 || align=left | — || 
|- id="2003 YZ189" bgcolor=#E9E9E9
| 2 ||  || MBA-M || 18.4 || data-sort-value="0.62" | 620 m || multiple || 2003–2019 || 05 Nov 2019 || 30 || align=left | — || 
|- id="2003 YA190" bgcolor=#E9E9E9
| 0 ||  || MBA-M || 17.8 || 1.2 km || multiple || 2003–2020 || 11 Oct 2020 || 65 || align=left | — || 
|- id="2003 YB190" bgcolor=#d6d6d6
| 1 ||  || MBA-O || 17.3 || 1.9 km || multiple || 2003–2020 || 23 Jan 2020 || 28 || align=left | Disc.: SpacewatchAdded on 22 July 2020 || 
|- id="2003 YD190" bgcolor=#E9E9E9
| 1 ||  || MBA-M || 17.4 || 1.4 km || multiple || 2003–2021 || 18 Jan 2021 || 55 || align=left | Disc.: SpacewatchAdded on 22 July 2020 || 
|- id="2003 YE190" bgcolor=#E9E9E9
| 0 ||  || MBA-M || 17.6 || 1.3 km || multiple || 1998–2020 || 16 Dec 2020 || 73 || align=left | Disc.: SpacewatchAdded on 22 July 2020 || 
|- id="2003 YG190" bgcolor=#E9E9E9
| 1 ||  || MBA-M || 18.6 || data-sort-value="0.80" | 800 m || multiple || 2003–2020 || 14 Sep 2020 || 40 || align=left | Disc.: Spacewatch Added on 19 October 2020 || 
|- id="2003 YH190" bgcolor=#E9E9E9
| 0 ||  || MBA-M || 18.2 || data-sort-value="0.96" | 960 m || multiple || 2003–2021 || 15 Jan 2021 || 47 || align=left | Disc.: Spacewatch Added on 19 October 2020 || 
|- id="2003 YJ190" bgcolor=#E9E9E9
| 3 ||  || MBA-M || 18.2 || data-sort-value="0.96" | 960 m || multiple || 2003–2020 || 13 Oct 2020 || 29 || align=left | Disc.: MLSAdded on 17 January 2021 || 
|- id="2003 YK190" bgcolor=#d6d6d6
| 0 ||  || MBA-O || 16.9 || 2.3 km || multiple || 2003–2021 || 17 Jan 2021 || 65 || align=left | Disc.: LPL/Spacewatch IIAdded on 17 January 2021 || 
|- id="2003 YM190" bgcolor=#E9E9E9
| 1 ||  || MBA-M || 17.5 || 1.3 km || multiple || 2003–2021 || 16 Jan 2021 || 66 || align=left | Disc.: SpacewatchAdded on 17 January 2021 || 
|- id="2003 YN190" bgcolor=#fefefe
| 0 ||  || MBA-I || 18.3 || data-sort-value="0.65" | 650 m || multiple || 2003–2020 || 24 Oct 2020 || 38 || align=left | Disc.: SpacewatchAdded on 17 January 2021 || 
|- id="2003 YP190" bgcolor=#E9E9E9
| 0 ||  || MBA-M || 18.8 || data-sort-value="0.73" | 730 m || multiple || 2003–2021 || 13 Jan 2021 || 39 || align=left | Disc.: SpacewatchAdded on 9 March 2021 || 
|- id="2003 YR190" bgcolor=#fefefe
| 0 ||  || MBA-I || 18.7 || data-sort-value="0.54" | 540 m || multiple || 1999–2017 || 22 Oct 2017 || 31 || align=left | Disc.: MLSAdded on 17 June 2021 || 
|- id="2003 YS190" bgcolor=#fefefe
| 1 ||  || HUN || 18.6 || data-sort-value="0.57" | 570 m || multiple || 2003–2021 || 18 Jun 2021 || 40 || align=left | Disc.: SpacewatchAdded on 21 August 2021 || 
|- id="2003 YU190" bgcolor=#d6d6d6
| 3 ||  || MBA-O || 17.6 || 1.7 km || multiple || 2003–2019 || 08 Oct 2019 || 27 || align=left | Disc.: Pan-STARRSAdded on 30 September 2021 || 
|- id="2003 YV190" bgcolor=#d6d6d6
| 1 ||  || MBA-O || 17.2 || 2.0 km || multiple || 2003–2019 || 04 Dec 2019 || 25 || align=left | Disc.: MLSAdded on 30 September 2021 || 
|- id="2003 YW190" bgcolor=#fefefe
| 0 ||  || MBA-I || 18.3 || data-sort-value="0.65" | 650 m || multiple || 2002–2021 || 28 Sep 2021 || 48 || align=left | Disc.: Pan-STARRSAdded on 30 September 2021 || 
|- id="2003 YX190" bgcolor=#E9E9E9
| 0 ||  || MBA-M || 18.22 || 1.3 km || multiple || 2003–2021 || 13 Sep 2021 || 33 || align=left | Disc.: Pan-STARRSAdded on 30 September 2021 || 
|- id="2003 YY190" bgcolor=#E9E9E9
| 1 ||  || MBA-M || 18.2 || 1.3 km || multiple || 2003–2021 || 15 Sep 2021 || 19 || align=left | Disc.: NEATAdded on 5 November 2021 || 
|- id="2003 YZ190" bgcolor=#E9E9E9
| 0 ||  || MBA-M || 17.6 || data-sort-value="0.90" | 900 m || multiple || 2003–2021 || 14 May 2021 || 47 || align=left | Disc.: SDSSAdded on 24 December 2021 || 
|- id="2003 YA191" bgcolor=#FA8072
| 0 ||  || HUN || 19.28 || data-sort-value="0.41" | 410 m || multiple || 2003–2022 || 12 Jan 2022 || 45 || align=left | Disc.: SpacewatchAdded on 24 December 2021 || 
|- id="2003 YB191" bgcolor=#fefefe
| 0 ||  || MBA-I || 19.28 || data-sort-value="0.41" | 410 m || multiple || 2003–2021 || 04 Oct 2021 || 35 || align=left | Disc.: Pan-STARRSAdded on 24 December 2021 || 
|- id="2003 YC191" bgcolor=#fefefe
| 0 ||  || HUN || 19.41 || data-sort-value="0.39" | 390 m || multiple || 2003–2022 || 25 Jan 2022 || 33 || align=left | Disc.: No observationsAdded on 29 January 2022 || 
|- id="2003 YD191" bgcolor=#E9E9E9
| 1 ||  || MBA-M || 17.5 || 1.8 km || multiple || 2003–2022 || 26 Jan 2022 || 45 || align=left | Disc.: No observationsAdded on 29 January 2022 || 
|}
back to top

References 
 

Lists of unnumbered minor planets